The House of Staunton (HOS) is an Alabama-based company founded by Frank Camaratta (b. 1943) in  1990 that manufactures chess pieces, chessboards, and chess boxes.

Chess sets

The HOS specializes in the manufacture of Staunton chess sets.  They offer a wide range of chess sets including older chess sets, which would have been used in the past centuries, including but not limited to:  the English Barleycorn chess set, the St. George chess set, the French Regence chess set and the Selenus chess set.

Literature
Frank Camaratta is in the process of writing a book called “The Staunton Chessmen and Their Predecessors”.

See also
British Chess Company
Jaques of London

References

External links
House of Staunton - Homepage

Chess equipment manufacturers
Manufacturing companies of the United States
1990 establishments in Alabama
Manufacturing companies established in 1990